The 48th Guillermo Mendoza Memorial Scholarship Foundation Box Office Entertainment Awards (GMMSF-BOEA), honored the personalities, movies and TV programs in the Philippines, held on May 14, 2017 at the Henry Lee Irwin Theater in Ateneo de Manila University, Quezon City. Vice Ganda, Coco Martin, Daniel Padilla and Kathryn Bernardo lead winners at the annual awards. The awards night was aired on ABS-CBN's Sunday's Best on May 21, 2017.

Winners selection
The GMMSF honors Filipino actors, actresses and other performers' commercial success, regardless of artistic merit, in the Philippine entertainment industry. The award giving body selects the high-ranking Philippine films of 2016 based on total average rankings at box office published results as basis for awarding the three major categories in the awarding ceremonies, The Phenomenal Box Office Star, The Box Office King and The Box Office Queen.

Awards

Phenomenal Box Office Star
Vice Ganda and Coco Martin (The Super Parental Guardians) 
 Box Office King
 Daniel Padilla (Barcelona: A Love Untold)
 Box Office Queen
 Kathryn Bernardo (Barcelona: A Love Untold)
 Film Actor of the Year
 Dingdong Dantes (The Unmarried Wife) 
 Film Actress of the Year
 Vilma Santos (Everything About Her) 
 TV Actor of the Year
 Jericho Rosales (Magpahanggang Wakas) 
 TV Actress of the Year
 Kim Chiu (The Story of Us) 
Prince of Philippine Movies
 Alden Richards (Imagine You and Me) 
Princess of Philippine Movies
 Maine Mendoza (Imagine You and Me) 
 Prince of Philippine Television
 James Reid  (Till I Met You)
 Princess of Philippine Television
 Nadine Lustre (Till I Met You)
Comedy Actor of the Year
 Vic Sotto
 Comedy Actress of the Year
 Angelica Panganiban 
TV Supporting Actor of the Year
 Arjo Atayde (FPJ's Ang Probinsyano)
TV Supporting Actress of the Year 
 Susan Roces (FPJ's Ang Probinsyano)
 Most Popular Love Team of the Year
 Enrique Gil and Liza Soberano
Most Promising Love Team of the Year
 McCoy de Leon and Elisse Joson 
Most Promising Movie Actor of the Year 
 Joshua Garcia (Vince & Kath & James)
Most Promising Movie Actress of the Year 
 Julia Barretto (Vince & Kath & James)
 Most Promising TV Actor of the Year
 Joseph Marco (Pasión de Amor)
 Most Promising TV Actress of the Year 
 Yassi Pressman (FPJ's Ang Probinsyano)
Breakthrough Performance by an Actor in a Single Program
 Coco Martin (FPJ's Ang Probinsyano)
Male Concert Performers of the Year 
 Martin Nievera and Erik Santos (Royals)
Female Concert Performers of the Year
 Regine Velasquez and Angeline Quinto (Royals)
Male Recording Artist of the Year
 Alden Richards (Say It Again)
Female Recording Artist of the Year
 Sarah Geronimo (The Great Unknown)
Most Promising Male Singer/Performer of the Year 
 Bailey May (Bailey)
Most Promising Female Singer/Performer of the Year
 Ylona Garcia (My Name is Ylona Garcia)
Most Popular Recording/Performing Group
 #Hashtags (#Hashtags)
Most Promising Recording/Performing Group
 That's My Bae 
Breakthrough Child Star of Movies & TV
 McNeal "Awra" Briguela 
Most Popular Male Child Performer
 Simon "Onyok" Pineda 
Most Popular Female Child Performer 
 Xia Vigor 
All-Time Favorite Actor
 Ian Veneracion 
All-Time Favorite Actress
 Jodi Sta. Maria 
Most Popular Film Producer
 Star Cinema 
Most Popular Film Director
 Joyce Bernal (The Super Parental Guardians)
Most Popular Screenwriter
 Olivia Lamasan and Carmi Raymundo (Barcelona: A Love Untold)
Most Popular TV Program (News & Public Affairs)
 24 Oras 
Most Popular TV Program Primetime Drama
 FPJ's Ang Probinsyano 
Most Popular TV Program Daytime Drama 
 The Greatest Love
Most Popular TV Program-Talent (Search/Reality/Talk/Game)
 The Voice Kids Season 3
Most Popular TV Program (Musical Variety/Noontime and Primetime) 
 ASAP
Male TV Host of the Year
 Luis Manzano 
Female TV Host of the Year
 Toni Gonzaga-Soriano

Special awards
Bert Marcelo Lifetime Achievement Award
Ogie Alcasid
Global Achievement by a Filipino Artist
Lav Diaz (Ang Babaeng Humayo and Hele sa Hiwagang Hapis), Venice Golden Lion winner, Berlin Silver Bear Alfred Bauer Prize winner, Asian Film Awards Best Director and Best Screenplay nominee
Charo Santos-Concio (Ang Babaeng Humayo), Asian Film Awards Best Actress nominee
Jaclyn Jose (Ma' Rosa), Cannes Best Actress winner
Hasmine Killip (Pamilya Ordinaryo), Asia Pacific Screen Awards Best Performance by an Actress winner
Paolo Ballesteros (Die Beautiful), Tokyo Best Actor winner
Iza Calzado (Bliss), Osaka Yakushi Pearl Award for Best Performer winner
Ai-Ai delas Alas (Area), Queens New York Best Female Actor winner
Lotlot de Leon (1st Sem), All Lights India Sole Acting Citation for Exceptional Performance winner

References

Box Office Entertainment Awards
2017 film awards
2017 television awards
2017 music awards